Urosphena is a genus of Old World warblers in the family Cettiidae, formerly classified in the family Sylviidae. The genus was erected by Robert Swinhoe in 1877.

These warblers are generally brown on the upper parts and lighter in color below with a brown, gray, or yellowish wash. They are similar to genus Cettia but have shorter tails.

Species

References

 
Taxonomy articles created by Polbot